William John "Bullfrog" Dietrich (March 29, 1910 – June 20, 1978) was an American professional baseball pitcher. He played in Major League Baseball (MLB) from 1933 to 1948 for the Philadelphia Athletics, Washington Senators, and Chicago White Sox. His Pennsylvania-born parents of German ancestry were Charles, an accountant, and Berth (Hopes) Dietrich.

In 16 seasons, Dietrich posted a 108–128 career record. He recorded a winning mark in just three seasons, yet was usually close to .500 every year. His best year in terms of wins was 1944 when he went 16–17 for the White Sox.

On June 1, 1937, while with the White Sox, Dietrich no-hit the St. Louis Browns 8–0 at Comiskey Park.

Popular Culture
In the film A Christmas Story, Mr. Parker says that "the Sox traded Bullfrog" for a player named "Schottenhoffen".

See also
 List of Major League Baseball no-hitters
 List of bespectacled baseball players

References

External links

, or Retrosheet, or SABR Biography Project

1910 births
1978 deaths
American people of German descent
Major League Baseball pitchers
Baseball players from Philadelphia
Washington Senators (1901–1960) players
Chicago White Sox players
Philadelphia Athletics players
Harrisburg Senators players
Montreal Royals players
Oakland Oaks (baseball) players